Fedjebjørnen is the highest point on the island of Fedje which is located in Fedje Municipality in Vestland county, Norway. The hill is located on the southeastern part of the island, about halfway between the two villages on the island: Fedje and Stormark.

See also
List of mountains of Norway

References

Mountains of Vestland
Fedje